Rossellidae is a family of glass sponges belonging to the order Lyssacinosa. The family has a cosmopolitan distribution and is found at a large range of depths (and likely deeper).

Description 
The body is usually a cup-like structure. In stalked forms the body can be mushroom-like. Spicules protruding beyond the sponge surface, when present, are diactines (spicules with two pointed arms) or specialised outwardly protruding hypodermal pentactines (five pointed spicules).

The choanosomal skeleton consists of diactines, sometimes together with less frequent hexactines (spicules with six prongs). A large variety of microscleres occur in this family, including a variety of holactinoidal and asterous spicules.

Subfamilies and genera 
, WoRMS recognizes three subfamilies and twenty-six genera in the family:
 Subfamily Acanthascinae 
 Acanthascus 
 Rhabdocalyptus 
 Staurocalyptus 
 Subfamily Lanuginellinae 
 Calycosoma 
 Caulophacus 
 Doconesthes 
 Lanuginella 
 Lanugonychia 
 Lophocalyx 
 Mellonympha 
 Sympagella 
 Subfamily Rossellinae 
 Anoxycalyx 
 Aphorme 
 Asconema 
 Aulosaccus 
 Bathydorus 
 Crateromorpha 
 Hyalascus 
 Nodastrella 
 Rossella 
 Schaudinnia 
 Scyphidium 
 Symplectella 
 Trichasterina 
 Vazella 
 Vitrollula

References

Further reading
 Dohrmann, M. ; C. Göcke ; J. Reed & D. Janussen, 2012: Integrative taxonomy justifies a new genus, Nodastrella gen. nov., for North Atlantic "Rossella" species (Porifera: Hexactinellida: Rossellidae). Zootaxa 3383: 1-13.
 Sautya, S.; Tabachnick, K.R.; Ingole, B. 2010: First record of Hyalascus (Hexactinellida: Rossellidae) from the Indian Ocean, with description of a new species from a volcanic seamount in the Andaman Sea. Zootaxa, 2667: 64-68

External links 
 
 

Hexactinellida
Sponge families